Sawa Shabab (Youth Together) is a peace building radio drama aired in over thirty local radio stations within the Country of South Sudan.

Overview 
The radio drama hosts a number of young people and has discussions on community problems.

Partners 
The drama series of the Sawa Shabab (Youth Together) is being run and supported by the United States Institute for Peace as well as the Peace Techlab for the production and online airing in Radio stations including the grand and famous Radio Miraya.

According to UNICEF, radio programs like this has helped improve the gap of girl child related problems such as early child marriage among others. This is an indicator that the radio drama not only have a local importance but a worldwide effect to the different continents and people.

References 

South Sudanese radio dramas
Year of establishment missing